Durvilledoris was a genus of sea slugs, dorid nudibranchs, shell-less marine gastropod mollusks in the family Chromodorididae. This genus has become a synonym of Mexichromis Bertsch, 1977  Although the type species of this genus was transferred to Mexichromis two species were not reallocated nor mentioned in the text.

Species 
Species in the genus Durvilledoris previously included:
 Durvilledoris albofimbria Rudman, 1995
 Durvilledoris circumflava Rudman, 1990 
 Durvilledoris circumflavus Rudman, 1990: synonym of Durvilledoris circumflava Rudman, 1990
 Durvilledoris lemniscata Quoy & Gaimard, 1832: synonym of Mexichromis lemniscata (Quoy & Gaimard, 1832)
 Durvilledoris pusilla (Bergh, 1874): synonym of Mexichromis pusilla (Bergh, 1874)
 Durvilledoris similaris Rudman, 1986: synonym of Mexichromis similaris (Rudman, 1986)

References

Chromodorididae